Acallidia is a monotypic moth genus of the family Pyralidae. Its one species is Acallidia dentilinea.

References

Chrysauginae
Monotypic moth genera
Pyralidae genera